The Stony Brook Millstone Watershed Arboretum is an arboretum maintained by the nonprofit Stony Brook-Millstone Watershed Association. It is located at 31 Titus Mill Road, Hopewell Township, in Mercer County, New Jersey. It is open daily without charge.

The arboretum is located within the association's  nature reserve. Its tree collection includes Acer japonicum (Japanese maple), Acer saccharinum (silver maple), Carya spp. (hickory), Cedrus libani (blue atlas cedar), Fagus grandifolia (American beech), Ginkgo biloba (ginkgo), Ilex opaca (American holly), Liquidambar styraciflua (sweetgum), Magnolia sp. (magnolia), Metasequoia glyptostroboides (dawn redwood), Platanus occidentalis (American sycamore), and Quercus spp. (oak).

See also 
 List of botanical gardens in the United States

References

External links
Stony Brook Millstone Watershed Association

Arboreta in New Jersey
Botanical gardens in New Jersey
Protected areas of Mercer County, New Jersey
Hopewell Township, Mercer County, New Jersey